Neustadt an der Orla is a town in Saale-Orla-Kreis district, in Thuringia. It is situated at the small river Orla, 17 km north of Schleiz, and 25 km southeast of Jena. The former municipality Stanau was merged into Neustadt an der Orla in January 2019, and Linda bei Neustadt an der Orla, Knau and Dreba in December 2019.

Geography

Setting

The additive, which differentiates Neustadt an der Orla from other towns named Neustadt, owed the town the Orla River. The Orla rises east of the town Triptis. Near Orlamünde the Orla flows into the river Saale. The district is called after these two rivers that are typical for this region.

Towns and villages in the neighbourhood
Pillingsdorf, Rosendorf, Dreitzsch, Schmieritz, Kospoda, Weira, Lausnitz, Langenorla, Trockenborn-Wolfersdorf and Breitenhain.

Parts of Neustadt an der Orla
Neustadt (Orla) (12.52 km2)
Arnshaugk (0.24 km2)
Börthen (1.25 km2)
Breitenhain-Strößwitz (5.57 km2)
Dreba (12.47 km2)
Knau (15.92 km2, incl. Posen and Bucha)
Lichtenau (2.25 km2)
Linda bei Neustadt an der Orla (16.66 km2, incl. Steinbrücken, Köthnitz and Kleina)
Moderwitz (5.59 km2)
Molbitz (4.56 km2)
Neunhofen (4.54 km2)
Stanau (4.28 km2)
Total area: 86.08 km2

History
Within the German Empire (1871–1918), Neustadt an der Orla was part of the Grand Duchy of Saxe-Weimar-Eisenach.

Sons and daughters of the town

 Johann Ernst Hebenstreit (1702–1757), physician
 Friedrich Gumpert (1841–1906), hornist and music professor
 Johannes Walther (1860–1937), geologist
 Hans Fitz (1891–1972), stage author, actor and director
 Robert Döpel (1895–1982), nuclear physicist and professor
 Dietmar Schauerhammer (born 1955), bob driver

Other personalities

 Ottmar von Mohl (1846–1922), diplomat, died at the castle Arnshaugk near Neustadt
 Hanka Kupfernagel (born 1974), cyclist
 Nico Herzig (born 1983), footballer, lived the first years in the district Molbitz
 Denny Herzig (born 1984), footballer, lived the first years in the district Molbitz

References

Saale-Orla-Kreis
Grand Duchy of Saxe-Weimar-Eisenach